Nicolas Escudé was the defending champion but lost in the quarterfinals against Sébastien Grosjean.

Max Mirnyi won in the final 7–6(7–3), 6–4 against Raemon Sluiter.

Seeds
A champion seed is indicated in bold text while text in italics indicates the round in which that seed was eliminated.

  Juan Carlos Ferrero (quarterfinals, retired because of a sprained ankle)
  Roger Federer (semifinals)
  Marat Safin (second round)
  Albert Costa (first round)
  Tim Henman (first round)
  Sébastien Grosjean (semifinals)
  Àlex Corretja (first round)
  Sjeng Schalken (quarterfinals)

Draw

External links
 2003 ABN AMRO World Tennis Tournament Singles draw

2003 ABN AMRO World Tennis Tournament
Singles